PGME may refer to:

 Propylene glycol methyl ether, an organic solvent
 Postgraduate Medical Education and Training Board, a UK medical training organization